Edward Winter Clark (E. W. Clark) (February 25, 1830 – March 18, 1913) was an American missionary. Clark is known for his pioneering missionary work in Nagaland and for his work on transcribing the spoken Ao language into a written script. Clark created the first bilingual dictionary of the Ao language and, along with his wife, Mary Mead Clark, set up the first school in the Naga hills region of North-East India. Clark's wife, Mary Mead Clark, documented their experience in Assam and the Naga Hills in A Corner in India. The Clarks are buried in the Island Cemetery in the town of Amenia in Dutchess County, New York.

Early life
Clark was born on February 25, 1830, in North East, New York, and baptized into the Baptist faith at age 14. He attended Worcester Academy from 1839 to 1841, earned his master's degree from Brown University in 1857, and was ordained a preacher in 1859. Mary Mead was born in Amenia, New York.

Ministry in Nagaland
Clark and his wife arrived in Sibsagar, a town close to the Naga Hills in North-East India on March 30, 1869, where they encountered Naga tribespeople. Interested in converting them to Christianity, but unable to travel to the Naga Hills because of restrictions set by the British Raj and because his own mission did not grant him permission, Clark sent an evangelist named Gudhola Brown to the hills. Brown was successful in bringing in a few tribes people who were baptized by Clark. Clark made his first trip to the Naga Hills, to a village then known as Deka Haimong (Molungkimong) in December 1872. It was an important day in Naga history when the first Baptist Church was formed. It is no wonder Clark knew his calling would henceforth be with the Nagas. "'I believe I have found my life-work,' exclaimed Mr. Clark, as he entered the old press bungalow on his return from his twelve days' absence in the wilds of barbarism." He took care of the Naga Christians in Molungkimong from Sibsagor Mission Station until he was released for the Naga Mission. 

On receiving permission, Clark moved to Molungkimong in March 1876 (an Ao Naga village in the Mokokchung district of Nagaland) and lived there until October 24, 1876.

The glorious moment for Clark was not without troubles. The village became divided over the new religion. Some felt that Clark could not be trusted because he had the same white face as the British military. The Nagas opposed anything that would promote alliance with the encroaching British power. Clark was determined to dedicate himself to the people and trust the Lord alone for protection. But the division among the villagers and mistrust of the white man grew stronger. Therefore, the Christians along with Rev. Clark decided to form a new village so that they can worship God freely. On October 24, 1876, the Christians along with Rev. Clark and their sympathizers established Molung village. 

Molung (Molungyimsen) is the first Christian village in Nagaland because this is the first village formed with Christian prayers. It was in Molungyimsen that the first Naga Christian Association was held. Molungyimsen is also known as the Cradle of Education because the first school in Nagaland was established in Molung (Molungyimsen) in 1878. The first book in Nagaland was written and printed in Molungyimsen. In 1894 Clark moved the Naga Mission Center to Impur which is now known as the Ao Baptist Arogo Mungdang (Ao Baptist Arogo Mungdang).

In 1905 Clark saw a record one hundred and ninety baptisms. The work was truly blessed of God but Clark saw that better days were yet ahead. The Nagas were well aware that to accept Christianity would mean drastic changes in their social life. "Adherents of the old, cruel faith were quick to see that the gospel of peace and love would rapidly empty their skull houses and put to rout most of the old customs handed down from forefathers, for whom they held the greatest reverence. The missionaries presence and his teaching had spread like wildfire from mountain peak to peak and everywhere was fostered the suspicious spirit. Clark died on March 18, 1913 at age 83."

Legacy
Christianity brought an end to the practice of headhunting and destroyed most of the traditional culture and oral knowledge of the various Naga tribes. Clark's vision for a Christian Nagaland came true, with the high price of destroying the Naga's indigenous culture though it has advantages like marking end to cruelty like headhuning. By 1980 the Naga population was 572,742 and the Baptist population was 185,987.

Today the Census of India, puts the numbers of Christians to more than 90% of the population of Nagaland thus making it, with Meghalaya and Mizoram, one of the three Christian-majority states in India and the only state where Christians form 90% of the population. Nagaland is known as "the only predominantly Baptist state in the world."

Archives
A biographer of Clark conducting archival research at the American Baptist Historical Society at the Mission Center noted that much of Clark's correspondence was difficult to read, "written on both sides of onion skin paper".

See also
 Ao Baptist Arogo Mungdang
 Nagaland Baptist Church Council
 Angami Baptist Church Council

References

Bibliography
Kijung L. Ao, Nokinketer Muncgchen (Impur: Nagaland, Ao Baptist Arogo Mungdang, 1972)
A. C. Bowers, Under Headhunters' Eyes (Philadelphia: Judson Press, 1929)
F. S. Downs, Christianity in North East India (Delhi, Ispeck: 1976)
Tegenfelt, A Century of Growth

External links

 Clark – Missionary to Naga of India

1830 births
1913 deaths
Baptist missionaries from the United States
Baptist missionaries in India
Indian Protestants
American evangelists
Headhunting accounts and studies
Mokokchung
American expatriates in India
19th-century Baptists